Alka Mohanty is an Indian politician and wife of Kishore Kumar Mohanty who served as Member of Odisha Legislative Assembly from Brajarajnagar Assembly constituency.

References 

Indian politicians
Members of the Odisha Legislative Assembly
Odisha MLAs 2019–2024
Year of birth missing (living people)
Living people